Sister Anne Montgomery, RSCJ (20 November 1926 – 27 August 2012) was an American non-violent activist and educator of young children who was part of the Plowshares movements and campaigned against the US government for peace. Aside from teaching, she worked with the poor, advocated for peace and the Catholic Worker Movement. Anne Montgomery House in Washington, DC, run by the Society of the Sacred Heart, is named for her.

Early life 
Anne Montgomery was born on November 20, 1926 in San Diego California to a small family. She had one sibling, a younger brother. Montgomery was born into a Navy family which meant that she moved around a great deal during her childhood. She attended Eden Hall Academy of the Sacred Heart in Torresdale, Pennsylvania and Manhattanville College, graduating with a bachelor's and master's degree. She later earned a second master's degree from Columbia University in New York.

Society of the Sacred Heart 
In 1948, when Montgomery was 22 years old, she entered the Society of the Sacred Heart (RSCJ) in Albany. She made her first vows in 1951 and her final vows in 1956 in Rome. She taught at the Covenant of the Sacred Heart in New York City from 1959-1969 and at Street Academy of Albany in 1970. In 1975, she began educating children with learning disabilities. In the late 1970s, she returned to New York City to work with high school dropouts in East Harlem.

In the late 1970s, Montgomery joined the Catholic Worker House in New York, which was part of the Catholic Worker Movement. She was also a part of the Little Sisters of the Assumption in East Harlem. She became an advocate for peace, determined to disarm nuclear weapons using nonviolent tactics.

Activism

Plowshares Movement 
In 1980, Montgomery joined the Plowshares Eight which was an anti-nuclear weapons and Christian pacifist movement. The movement often consisted of members calling for the abolition of nuclear weapons. Some members of the movement damaged nuclear weapons and military bases to directly disarm the facilities. Montgomery was among the first that were arrested for these acts, and served time in prison. She participated in several other Plowshares movement actions, including one in 2009, at the age of 83.

In 1987 Montgomery co-edited a book with Art Laffin, Swords into Plowshares: Nonviolent Direct Action for Disarmament, about the Plowshares movement, and nonviolent direct action for disarmament, peace, and social justice.

Other peace activism 
In the late 1970s, Montgomery became a member of Pax Christi, which is the national catholic peace movement. Throughout the 90s, she travelled with Christian Peacemaker Teams (CPT) to places of conflict in Iraq, West Bank, Hebron, and the Balkans. In January 1991, she protested against the US bombing Iraq. She supported the Gulf Peace Team Camp on the Iraq-Saudi border which was there to provide a nonviolent presence before and during the initial stages of the war, and in 2000 she fasted for a month to show her disapproval of US support for the UN sanctions against Iraq.

In 2005, she participated in a 70-mile walk and a four-day fast and vigil with the organization witness against torture, which worked toward the closing of the Guantanamo Naval Base.

Anne Montgomery said the following regarding her peace activism: “civil disobedience is, traditionally, the breaking of a civil law to obey a higher law, sometimes with the hope of changing the unjust civil law. … But we should speak of such actions as divine obedience, rather than civil disobedience. The term ‘disobedience’ is not appropriate because any law that does not protect and enhance human life is no real law.”

Later life and death 
In 2012 Montgomery won the Courage of Conscience Award from the Peace Abbey in Sherborn, Massachusetts one week before her death. She died on August 27, 2012, at the age of 85 at Oakwood in Sacred Heart, Atherton, California.

References 

21st-century American Roman Catholic nuns
20th-century American Roman Catholic nuns